Professor Justin Stebbing is Editor-in-Chief of Nature’s cancer journal Oncogene, a visiting Professor of Cancer Medicine and Oncology at Imperial College, London  and a Professor of Biomedical Sciences at ARU, Cambridge. In October 2022 he joined the Phoenix Hospital Group in London to provide medical services to patients for the management of cancer, in person and remotely. He specialises in a range of solid malignancies (breast, GI, lung, others) including difficult cases with few conventional options and has published over 700 papers, the majority regarding new therapeutic and translational approaches including use of immunotherapies in clinical trials, many in the world's best journals.

Early life and education 
He graduated with a first class degree from Trinity College, Oxford. After completion of junior doctor positions in Oxford, he trained as on the residency programme at The Johns Hopkins Hospital in the US, returning to London to continue his career in oncology at The Royal Marsden and then St Bartholomew's Hospitals. Professor Stebbing's original PhD research investigated the interplay between the immune system and cancer. In 2007 he was appointed a senior lecturer, and then in 2009 a Professor, at Imperial College London.

Cancer research 
He has published over 700 peer-reviewed papers in academic journals   and has an h-index of 84 according to Google Scholar  He is an Editor-in-Chief of the journal Oncogene. He is a Fellow of the Royal College of Physicians, the American Society for Clinical Investigation  and the Royal College of Pathologists. The charity Action Against Cancer was set up to support Justin's work which concentrates on drug development and has the ambitious goal of developing cures. In cancer, some of his most cited papers include the discovery of the role of the oncogene LMTK3 across malignancies, the network of microRNAs induced by the estrogen receptor, and extensive work on HIV and AIDS cancers. In addition to his global contributions to cancer research including extensive work on biosimilars, cheaper versions of expensive biologic drugs designed to democratise access to these around the world in 2020 at the start of the pandemic.

COVID-19 research 
In addition to his global contributions to cancer research including new discoveries on stem cells, new cancer genes, biomarkers and also biosimilar studies. Professor Justin Stebbing made a global contribution to millions of lives by leveraging an artificial intelligence programme to identify baricitinib as a drug for the treatment of COVID-19 in early 2020. Uniquely this had antiviral and anti-cytokine properties. He led the global studies that showed that the drug reduced mortality in Covid patients with pneumonia — which led to the drug being authorised by the US Food and Drug Administration in 2020 at first in combination with remdesivir, then alone. His original Lancet papers have been cited >1000 times, and recent editorials in the New England Journal of Medicine and Lancet Respiratory Medicine describe this further, along with the major studies he led . The book, ‘Witness to COVID, 2020’  was written by Justin Stebbing describing its discovery, trials, studies and approval. In January 2022, following Professor Stebbing's pivotal original papers and the subsequent global trials, the World Health Organization placed baricitinib at the top of its evidence base to treat COVID, giving it its highest recommendation. This has also been made free to countries around the world as they have struggled with numbers of patients, considering it is a simple once daily tablet with few drug-drug interactions, side effects, has dose flexibility, a short half-life and is cheap as his work here has outlined. Based on Prof Stebbing's original AI hypothesis, following the success of the clinical trials including RECOVERY, in May 2022 the US FDA gave baricitinib an unconditional approval.

Neurological research 
Professor Stebbing works actively on neurological therapies for patients with unmet medical needs who are treatment resistant or unresponsive to other existing medications.

MPTS 
In 2020, Professor Justin Stebbing was investigated by the General Medical Council over allegations that he failed to provide adequate care to eleven patients with no further options who he had cared for between 2014 and 2017 and he returned to unrestricted practice in October 2022

References

Year of birth missing (living people)
Living people
Alumni of Trinity College, Oxford
Alumni of Imperial College London
Academics of Imperial College London
Fellows of the Royal College of Physicians
Fellows of the Royal College of Pathologists
British oncologists
NIHR Research Professors